Bashi is an unincorporated community in Clarke County, Alabama, United States.  It takes its name from the nearby Bashi Creek that flows westward into the Tombigbee River.

Geography
Bashi is in the Central Time Zone.

References

Alabama placenames of Native American origin
Unincorporated communities in Alabama
Unincorporated communities in Clarke County, Alabama